Abdel Rahman Abdel Hamid is the son of a sister of the former Libyan leader Muammar Gaddafi. He was a commander of the pro-Gaddafi forces fighting in Sirte before his capture by National Transitional Council forces as they captured strategic places in the city.

Role in the Libyan civil war
In the 2011 Libyan civil war, Abdel Hamid was a commander of a Pro-Gaddafi brigade in Sirte. There were reports that previously claimed he had been executed by his own men. Two weeks after this event, Al Jazeera broadcast that Abdel Hamid had indeed been captured as he fought in the Battle of Sirte.

References

Year of birth missing (living people)
Living people
Libyan military personnel
People of the First Libyan Civil War
Libyan prisoners and detainees
Prisoners and detainees of Libya
Abdel Rahman Abdel Hamid